Marko Rajković (born 13 November 1992) is a Serbian footballer who plays for Gimhae FC.

References

External links
 
 

1992 births
Footballers from Belgrade
Living people
Serbian footballers
Association football forwards
FK Resnik players
RFK Grafičar Beograd players
FK Sinđelić Beograd players
FK Teleoptik players
KF Apolonia Fier players
FK Kolubara players
FK Metalac Gornji Milanovac players
FK Sloboda Užice players
FK Sileks players
Akademija Pandev players
Happy Valley AA players
FK Zvijezda 09 players
Boeung Ket Rubber Field players
Serbian First League players
Kategoria Superiore players
Kategoria e Parë players
Macedonian First Football League players
Hong Kong Premier League players
First League of the Republika Srpska players
Serbian expatriate footballers
Expatriate footballers in Albania
Serbian expatriate sportspeople in Albania
Expatriate footballers in North Macedonia
Serbian expatriate sportspeople in North Macedonia
Expatriate footballers in Hong Kong
Serbian expatriate sportspeople in Hong Kong
Expatriate footballers in Bosnia and Herzegovina
Serbian expatriate sportspeople in Bosnia and Herzegovina
Expatriate footballers in Cambodia
Serbian expatriate sportspeople in Cambodia